"We Made You" is a song by American rapper Eminem from his sixth studio album Relapse (2009). It was released as the second single from the album on April 7, 2009. "We Made You" was written by Eminem, Dr. Dre, Dawaun Parker, Mark Batson, Trevor Lawrence Jr. and Walter Egan. Production was handled by Dr. Dre, with Eminem and Doc Ish serving as additional co-producers.

"We Made You" received generally positive reviews from music critics, and became a success, peaking inside the Top 10 in fourteen countries and at number nine on the Billboard Hot 100. Just like "Shake That", this single is known for being a departure from the serious tone of his second released singles from his previous albums such as "Cleanin' Out My Closet", "The Way I Am" and "Like Toy Soldiers", instead having a more comedic tone.

Background
It features chorus vocals by Charmagne Tripp. Produced by Dr. Dre and co-produced by Doc Ish and Eminem himself, the song samples "Hot Summer Nights" by Walter Egan. The official cover for the single is a picture of the music video, with Eminem, Oxen, Lisa Ann and Bobby Lee.

Critical reception
"We Made You" has generally positive reviews from contemporary music critics. Daniel Kreps of Rolling Stone magazine gave it a positive review stating, "It's nice to see Eminem goofing around again after a few years out of the spotlight during which he grappled with serious issues like the death of his friend Proof, and 'We Made You' with its damnation of current celebrities will likely prove to be a solid pop cultural time capsule of this weird 2009 moment we're experiencing now." Billboard said, "Atop Dr. Dre's marching beat is primarily piano instrumentation, which amid drums and tubas give the track a carnival feel... And in case his word play was too fast and strange accent too difficult to decipher, Charmagne Tripp sings the chorus." Tim Jonze of The Guardian however, reported, "'We Made You' is not Eminem doing what he does best."

Chart performance
"We Made You" sold 167,000 downloads in its first week to enter the Hot Digital Songs chart in Billboard Magazine at number three. The song also debuted at number nine on the Billboard Hot 100, to become Eminem's second top ten in a row on the chart, ranked "Crack a Bottle", a collaboration with Dr. Dre and 50 Cent. This marks the first time that Eminem has had back-to-back top-ten hits on the Hot 100 as a lead artist since 2002, when he scored with "Without Me", "Cleanin' Out My Closet" and "Lose Yourself". "We Made You" has reached the top ten in twelve countries, including number one in Ireland, New Zealand, Australia and Germany.

Music video

Development and release
The single's music video was directed by Joseph Kahn, who also shot "Without Me" from The Eminem Show is in the same vein as previous videos under the Slim Shady persona, and the first of its kind since Encores "Ass Like That". The video was filmed in Las Vegas and features guest star appearances by Dr. Dre, 50 Cent, Denaun Porter, Bobby Lee, The Palms hotel owner George Maloof, Francesca Le (playing Kim Kardashian), Melissa Peterman, Vanilla Ice, Trisha Paytas (playing Jessica Simpson's role in The Dukes of Hazzard), Derrick Barry (of America's Got Talent fame, playing Britney Spears), actress Gabrielle Salinger (playing Amy Winehouse) and pornographic actress Lisa Ann (playing Sarah Palin). The music video for "We Made You" premiered on April 7, 2009 at 6:00 AM on several MTV networks, as well as MTV.com. The video also premiered on Channel 4 in the United Kingdom on the next day.

There is an R-Rated Director's Cut version of the video that premiered in a live show of Eminem's Concert in 2009. It features Lisa Ann fully nude as well as various shots of Eminem touching her breasts. In 2022, a high resolution version was leaked onto Reddit and made publicly available for the first time.

Concept
The music video parodies TV shows Rock of Love and Star Trek (with the Starfleet insignia replaced with an inverted 2nd Infantry Division), as well as video game Guitar Hero with Eminem against an imitation version background of the notes while the homage to film Rain Man was shot at The Palms, a film Eminem has previously referenced in his lyrics. Alfred Hitchcock's Psycho is also homaged. On April 3, 2009, Eminem talked about the music video in an MTV News interview, stating that there is some "Celebrity bashing in it", which is often a feature of his album's lead singles. Celebrities mocked include Bret Michaels, Kevin Federline, Britney Spears, Lindsay Lohan, Samantha Ronson, Amy Winehouse and her then-husband Blake Fielder-Civil, Ellen DeGeneres, Portia de Rossi, Jessica Alba, Elvis Presley, Tony Romo, John Mayer, Jennifer Aniston, and Kim Kardashian. Eminem spoofed himself, wearing an ALF T-shirt and holding a cake, referencing a commonly circulated pre-fame photo of him of when he was an adolescent. The video features appearances from Lisa Ann as Sarah Palin, Trisha Paytas as Jessica Simpson, and Derrick Barry, a famous Britney Spears female impersonator, as Spears. The video also features appearances from Dr. Dre and 50 Cent as themselves.

Reception
The music video won the award at the 2009 MTV Video Music Awards for Best Hip-Hop Video and was nominated for Best Male Video as well as Video of the Year. The video also ranked at #81 on BET's Notarized: Top 100 Videos of 2009 countdown. The music video also features Beats by Dr. Dre Monster headphones.

Awards and nominations

Track listing
Digital EP

UK CD single

German CD single

Notes
 signifies an additional producer.

Personnel
Mark Batson – keyboards
Charmagne Tripp – chorus vocals

Charts

Weekly charts

Year-end charts

Certifications

See also
List of number-one singles in Australia in 2009
List of number-one singles of 2009 (Ireland)
List of number-one singles from the 2000s (New Zealand)
List of Romanian Singles Chart top 10 Singles in 2009

References

2009 singles
Eminem songs
Music videos directed by Joseph Kahn
Number-one singles in Australia
Irish Singles Chart number-one singles
Number-one singles in New Zealand
Number-one singles in Scotland
Song recordings produced by Eminem
Song recordings produced by Dr. Dre
Shady Records singles
Aftermath Entertainment singles
Interscope Records singles
2009 songs
Songs written by Mike Elizondo
Songs written by Dr. Dre
Songs written by Eminem
Songs written by Walter Egan
Comedy rap songs
LGBT-related songs
Cultural depictions of Elvis Presley
Cultural depictions of Britney Spears
Cultural depictions of Sarah Palin
Songs written by Dawaun Parker